For the ancient Greeks, “India" referred to the polity situated east of Persia and south of the Himalayas (with the exception of Serica). Although, during different periods of history, "India" referred to a much wider or much less extensive place. The Greeks referred to the ancient Indians as "Indoi"; the Indians referred to the Greeks as "Yonas (Yavanas)" in reference to the Ionians.

Mythology and legends

Dionysus

Megasthenes wrote about the prehistoric arrival of the God Dionysus in India.

According to Philostratus, god Dionysus was called Nysian or Nysean (Νύσιος) by the Indians. Most probably, because according to legend he founded the city of Nysa in India. When Alexander the Great arrived at the city, representatives of the city met him and told him not to capture the city and the land because the god had founded the city and named it Nysa after his nurse and also he named the mountain near the city, Meron (Μηρόν) (i.e. thigh), because he grew in the thigh of Zeus. More about the city below at the "Cities and places" section.

Apollonius Rhodius in Argonautica wrote about the Nysean, son of Zeus, who had left the tribes of the Indians and came to dwell at Thebes.

In addition, Philostratus mention that at Delphi there was a disk of silver as an offering bearing the inscription: "Dionysus the son of Semele and of Zeus, from the men of India to the Apollo of Delphi" (ΔΙΟΝΥΣΟΣ Ο ΣΕΜΕΛΗΣ ΚΑΙ ΔΙΟΣ ΑΠΟ ΙΝΔΩΝ ΑΠΟΛΛΩΝΙ ΔΕΛΦΩΙ). Furthermore, he mention that Indians who dwell in the Caucasus and along the river Cophen said that Dionysus was an Assyrian visitor when he came to them, who knew the religious rites of the Theban (according to some Greek myths god Dionysus was born in Thebes) while Indians who inhabit the district between the Indus and the Hydraotes and the continental region beyond, which ends at the river Ganges, declare that Dionysus was son of the river Indus, and that the Dionysus of Thebes was his disciple.

The epic poem Dionysiaca by Nonnus, talked about the god Dionysus’ expedition to India. He also wrote about the Colletes who was huge, immense and formidable and his ancestor was the founder of the Indian race. In addition, in book 14 Hera transformed into an Indian in order to talk and persuade the Indian chief to fight the Dionysus army.

Apollodorus in Bibliotheca wrote about Dionysus and the Indians.

Polyaenus wrote that after Dionysus had subdued the Indians, he formed an alliance with them and the Amazons, and took them into his service. He later used them in his campaign against the Bactria.

A hymn to Dionysus in Greek Anthology called Dionysus Indoletes (Ἰνδολέτης), which means slayer/killer of Indians. Other poems in Greek Anthology also mention the campaign of Dionysus against the Indians.

Phylarchus wrote that Dionysus was the first to bring from India into Egypt two bulls and that the name of one was Apis and of the other Osiris. But Plutarch, found this theory absurd.

Herakles

Megasthenes wrote about the prehistoric arrival of Herakles (Megasthenes' Herakles) in India.

Pandaie, was a daughter of Heracles whom he fathered in India. He gave her the southern part of India which is by the sea and she was a queen there.

Others
Ganges was personified by the Greeks as a river god. Limaee was the Naiad-nymph of a lake in India and daughter of the river Ganges. She had a son named Athis.

Hydaspes was personified by the Greeks as a river god (Hydaspes (mythology)). He supported the Indians in their war against the invading armies of the god Dionysus. He was the son of Thaumas and Elektra, and brother of the Iris. In addition, the king of the Indians Deriades (Δηριάδης) was the son of Hydaspes and Astris, who was a daughter of the god Helios.

In Greek Anthology, Philodemus wrote that Perseus was in love with the Indian Andromeda.

Apollodorus in Bibliotheca wrote that Medus conquered many barbarians and called the whole country under him Media. But when he was marching against the Indians he died.

Dictys Cretensis, author of a pseudo-chronicle of the Trojan War, wrote that "Memnon, the son of Tithonus and Aurora, arrived with a large army of Indians and Ethiopians; a truly remarkable army which consisted of thousands and thousands of men with various kinds of arms, and surpassed the hopes and prayers even of Priam."

Ancient Greek writers have written about Manticore, a monstrous creature which lived in India.

Greek writers wrote that there were Cynocephaly (dog-headed) tribes in India. Aulus Gellius in Attic Nights mentioned that some writers wrote also about a tribe in farthest India with bodies that are rough and covered with feathers like birds, who eat no food but live by inhaling the perfume of flowers.

Eratosthenes said that the Macedonians, seeing a cavern in the land of the Parapamisadians, and hearing a certain legend which was current among the natives, or themselves forming a conjecture, spread the report that this forsooth was the cave where Prometheus had been bound.

According to the Latin Letter from Alexander the Great to Aristotle a creature called Odontotyrannos attacked Alexander's men at their camp in India.

John Malalas has mixed the fictionalized work of the Pseudo-Callisthenes, Alexander Romance, with other materials and wrote about an affair of Alexander the Great with Kandake, adding that they got married. Malalas wrote that Kandake was an Indian queen and Alexander met her during his Indian campaign.

Antigonus of Carystus, Aristotle and Ctesias wrote that there were Indian donkeys (ἰνδικὸς ὄνος) which were one-horned. Animals similar to Unicorns.

Herodotus, wrote about Gold-digging ants in India which were smaller than dogs but larger than foxes. Aelian, wrote that "The Indian ants (μύρμηκες οἱ Ἰνδικοὶ) which guard the gold will not cross the river Campylinus".

The Indian Dragons were a breed of giant serpents which could fight and strangle the elephants of India.

At Taprobana (modern Sri Lanka) there were Cetea (sea monsters) with different forms.

Ancient Greek sources are mentioning about a breed of gigantic worms in India.

Contact, records and influence between the two civilizations

Coinage and inscriptions

The Kushan Empire used the Greek alphabet and on their coins they used Greek legends. They also adopted other elements of the Greek culture of the Hellenistic Kingdoms. Art themes derived from Greek mythology were common initially but later Buddhist imagery dominated.

The Nahapana, ruler of the Western Kshatrapas,  established the Kshatrapa coinage, derived from Indo-Greek coinage. The obverse of the coins consists of the profile of the ruler with a legend in Greek while the reverse represents a thunderbolt and an arrow, within Brahmi and Kharoshthi legends.

The Rabatak inscription uses Greek script to write a language described as Arya. The inscription relates to the rule of the Kushan emperor Kanishka.

The city of Kapisi appeared on Indo-Greek coins.

The king Gondophares minted coins with the Greek title of autokrator.

In a kharoshthi found in the Swat area of Gandhara, which dated to the 1st century BC, there was a dedication from the Greek meridarch Theodorus.

Art and literature

In Sophocles' work, Antigone, Creon mentions the gold of India.

The Gandhara art was heavily influenced by the Greek style.

The Art of Mathura is a blend of Indian and Greek art.

The satirist Lucian wrote that Indians get drunk very easy with wine and they get worse than any Greek or Roman would be.

In Greek Anthology, India and Indians are mentioned in many occasions.

The Pompeii Lakshmi, an Indian sculpture of Lakshmi found in the ruins of Roman Pompeii.

At the Nasik Caves, some of the caves have been built by Greek descents.

The murals in the Ajanta Caves are painted in such a way, which suggest a Greek influence.

The Indian theater had adopted some elements of the Greek comedy.

The Yavana Ganika (Greek Ganika. A Ganika in India was similar to a Hetaira in the Greek world) was a common sight in India. These girls were also trained in the theatrical arts.

Kalidasa mention the Yayanis (Greek maidens) in his work.

Historians and geographers

Hecataeus of Miletus, wrote a survey of Asia and Africa in his Periígisis (Greek: Περιήγησις: to browse), now lost, which contained some information on India.

Herodotus in his work Histories, includes important remarks on India.

Ctesias in his work Indika, records the beliefs and view of the Persians about India.

Ephorus wrote that the Indians inhabit a country in the east near sunrise.

Xenophon in his work Cyropaedia mentioned India and the Indians.

Aristobulus of Cassandreia wrote  about the customs and the animals of India.

Cleitarchus, probably did not travel to India, but his account of the country, based on Onesicritus’ and Nearchus’ reports, gained much popularity.

Pseudo-Scymnus wrote in Circuit of the Earth that Indians occupy almost all the land toward the East.

Eratosthenes attempted to calculate the exact size and shape of India, relying on reports written by travelers.

Dionysius Periegetes described how Indians looked like.

Arrian wrote about India in his work Indica.

Quintus Curtius Rufus wrote about the Indian campaign of Alexander the Great in his work Histories of Alexander the Great.

Strabo described India in his work Geographica. He referred to India several times during the course of the book and he devoted book 15 to an extended description of the country.

Clitophon of Rhodes, wrote books about India. Pseudo-Plutarch mention the First Book of Indian Relations.

Stephanus of Byzantium wrote about geographical, mythological, and religious information about India.

Ammianus Marcellinus in his work History wrote about India.

Jordanes at the Getica wrote about India.

Ptolemy, described many places as far as Barousai and Yabadiou or Sabadiou, which researchers identify respectively as the Indonesian places of Barus in Northern Sumatra and Java.

Astronomy and astrology
Greek astronomical texts were translated into Sanskrit.
Yavaneśvara, translated the Yavanajataka, one of the earliest writings of Indian astrology, from Greek to Sanskrit. The zodiac signs introduced into India by the Greeks.

The Paulisa Siddhanta is also influenced by Greek source.

The Romaka Siddhanta is based on the astronomical learning of the Byzantine Empire.

The Gargi Samhita states: "The Yavanas (Greeks) are barbarians, yet the science of astronomy originated with them and for this they must be reverenced like gods".

The Yuga Purana mentioned the Greeks.

Philosophy and religion

Pyrrhonism

The philosopher Pyrrho accompanied Alexander the Great on his Indian campaign, According to Diogenes Laërtius, Pyrrho developed his philosophy of Pyrrhonism in India when Pyrrho was there during the conquest of Alexander the Great. According to Christopher I. Beckwith's analysis, Pyrrho's philosophy was strikingly similar to the Buddhist three marks of existence, indicating that Pyrrho's teaching is based on Buddhism.

Because of the high degree of similarity between Nāgārjuna's philosophy and Pyrrhonism, particularly the surviving works of Sextus Empiricus Thomas McEvilley suspects that Nāgārjuna was influenced by Greek Pyrrhonist texts imported into India.

Diogenes Laërtius wrote that Anaxarchus, Pyrrho's teacher, met and spoke with Indian gymnosophists and magi.

Buddhism
Buddhism flourished under the Indo-Greeks, leading to the Greco-Buddhist cultural syncretism. The arts of the Indian sub-continent were also quite affected by Hellenistic art during and after these interactions. (Hellenistic influence on Indian art). The iconography of Vajrapani  is clearly that of the hero Heracles, with varying degrees of hybridization.
Menander I was one of the patrons of Buddhism, he also was the subject of the Milinda Panha.

Dharmaraksita was a Greek who was converted to Buddhism. He was one of the missionaries sent by the Mauryan emperor Ashoka to proselytize Buddhism.

Mahadharmaraksita was a Greek Buddhist master, who according to Mahāvaṃsa traveled to Anuradhapura in Sri Lanka together with 30,000 Greek Buddhist monks from Alexandria of the Caucasus.
In addition, Mahāvaṃsa mention how early Buddhists from Sri Lanka went to Alexandria of the Caucasus to learn Buddhism.

The Kandahar Greek Edicts of Ashoka, which are among the Ashoka's Major Rock Edicts of the Indian Emperor Ashoka were written in the Greek language. In addition, the Kandahar Bilingual Rock Inscription was written in Greek and Aramaic. Ashoka used the word "eusebeia" (piety) as a Greek translation for the central Buddhist and Hindu concept of "dharma" in the Kandahar Bilingual Rock Inscription.

Ptolemy II Philadelphus is also mentioned in the Edicts of Ashoka as a recipient of the Buddhist proselytism of Ashoka:

Buddhist gravestones from the Ptolemaic Egypt have been found in Alexandria decorated with depictions of the dharma wheel, showing the presence of Buddhists in Hellenistic Egypt.

Buddhist manuscripts in cursive Greek, dated later than the 2nd century AD, have been found in Afghanistan. Some mention the "Lokesvararaja Buddha" (λωγοασφαροραζοβοδδο).

Peripateticism
Aristotle’s knowledge of India came essentially from Scylax and Ctesias. He quoted Scylax to refer to Indian politics and mentions seven Indian animals, by clearly drawing on Ctesias.

The Peripatetic philosopher Clearchus of Soli, traveled to the east to study Indian religions.

The Peripatetic philosopher Theophrastus, in his book on history of plants contains an excursus on Indian species. Also, in his work "On stones" describe rocks, stones and gems that are produced in India.

The Peripatetic philosopher  Aristocles of Messene (cited by the Christian polemicist Eusebius) said an Indian conversed with Socrates in Athens.

And Aristoxenus the musician said that this argument comes from the Indians. For a man of that people met Socrates in Athens and asked him what his philosophy was about; and when he said that he was investigating human life, the Indian laughed at him, saying that no one could understand human affairs if he ignored the divine. Whether this is true, no one can say for sure.

Christian

Clement of Alexandria wrote about India, Gymnosophists, Brahmans, Buddha, etc. in the Stromata.

The Greek theologian Pantaenus was said to have traveled to India.

The Suda write that during the reign of Constantine the Great, the nearer Indians were baptized.

Sophism
The Greek Sophist Philostratus, in his work Life of Apollonius of Tyana and the Suda, mentioned that the Greek philosopher Apollonius had traveled to India.

The Sophist Dio Chrysostom mentioned India in his work Discourses and wrote that Homer's poetry is sung in India. He also mentioned that Bactrians and Indians were to be found in his audience in Alexandria (circa 100 CE).

Others
The philosopher Democritus was said to have traveled to India.

The Sibylline Oracles mentioned India.

The Cynic philosopher Onesicritus wrote about the gymnosophists, the people and the landscape of India.

The Academic Skeptic philosopher Favorinus owned an Indian slave named Autolekythos.

Ptolemy, wrote about the Brahmanas, Narmada River and more.

The Neoplatonic philosopher Ammonius Saccas may have been of Shakyan Indian descent.

Varāhamihira, in a passage where he calls on the people to honour the Brahmans, said: “the Greeks, though impure, must be honoured, since they are trained in sciences, and therein excelled others. What, then are we to say of a Brahman, if he combines with his purity the height of science?”

Scythianus traveled to India several times during the first century CE. He studied Indian philosophy there. He eventually settled in Alexandria Egypt and became a religious teacher. He wrote four books, which because the source of Manichaenism.

Political and military
During the Second Persian invasion of Greece, the Persian army had Indian troops, both infantry and cavalry.

At the Battle of Gaugamela, Darius used Indian troops against Alexander the Great. Later, during the Indian campaign of Alexander the Great, Alexander's army fought many battles against Indian tribes and kingdoms including the battle against the army of Porus the Elder. Plutarch wrote  about the battle at his work Parallel Lives, "Life of Alexander". The Indian King Ambhi (Greeks called him Taxiles in their scripts) supported Alexander with his forces. Philostratus the Elder in the Life of Apollonius of Tyana wrote that in the army of Porus there was an elephant who fought brave against Alexander's army and Alexander dedicated it to the Helios (Sun) and named it "Ajax", because he thought that a so great animal deserved a great name. The elephant had gold rings around its tusks and an inscription was on them written in Greek: "Alexander the son of Zeus dedicates Ajax to the Helios" (ΑΛΕΞΑΝΔΡΟΣ Ο ΔΙΟΣ ΤΟΝ ΑΙΑΝΤΑ ΤΩΙ ΗΛΙΩΙ). Alexander, also met and talked with Indian gymnosophists, including Dandamis and Kalanos.

Alexander let the Taxiles and Porus to keep their kingdoms and added Paropamisadae to the kingdom of Oxyartes. In addition, he gave to Peithon and Philip Indian satrapies. The Indian king Abisares who sent embassies of submission to Alexander was allowed to retain his kingdom with considerable additions.

Alexander also conquered the kingdom of the Indian king Phegeus. The inhabitants welcomed Alexander's army and the king met Alexander and gave him many gifts. He also conquered the city of Sagala.

Alexander asked Phegeus and Porus what was after the Hyphasis River and after their response he decided to continue. He was preparing to march against the Indian King Xandrames, before his army mutinied.

After the mutiny of his army, he conducted the Mallian campaign. 

And then conducted the campaign against the Oritians and Arabitians. After he conquered them, he placed Apollophanes as Satrap in the area.

According to ancient writers, the Queen Cleophis of Massaga had a son with Alexander the Great. But modern historians dismiss it.

The pankratiast and Olympic winner Dioxippus accompanied Alexander to India.

After the Battle of Gabiene, Antigonus I Monophthalmus sent the Argyraspides to Sibyrtius at Arachosia.

Indo-Greek kingdoms and Greco-Bactrian Kingdoms were founded by the successors of Alexander the Great. (Greek conquests in India)

According to Indian sources, Greek troops seem to have assisted Chandragupta Maurya in toppling the Nanda Dynasty and founding the Mauryan Empire.

Later, Seleucus I army encountered Chandragupta army. Chandragupta and Seleucus finally concluded an alliance. Seleucus gave him his daughter in marriage, ceded the territories of Arachosia, Herat, Kabul and Makran and he received 500 war elephants.

Bindusara, the second Mauryan emperor of India, had diplomatic relations and very friendly feelings towards the Greeks. He even asked from Antiochus I Soter to sent him a Greek sophist for his court.

Megasthenes had traveled to India and had several interviews with Chandragupta Maurya known as Sandracottus to the Greeks.

Ptolemy II Philadelphus is recorded by Pliny the Elder as having sent an ambassador named Dionysius to the Mauryan court at Pataliputra in India, probably to Emperor Ashoka:
"But [India] has been treated of by several other Greek writers who resided at the courts of Indian kings, such, for instance, as Megasthenes, and by Dionysius, who was sent thither by Philadelphus, expressly for the purpose: all of whom have enlarged upon the power and vast resources of these nations." Pliny the Elder, "The Natural History", Chap. 21 

Asoka, also appointed some Greeks in high offices of state (Yavanaraja, meaning Greek King or Governor), for example the Tushaspha. In addition, in his edicts mention about a Yona (Greek) province on the north-west border of India, most probably the Arachosia.

Polybius wrote about the use of Indian elephants in battles and about the alliance between the Indian king Sophagasenus and Antiochus III the Great.

Diodorus, quoting Iambulus, mentioned that the king of Pataliputra had a "great love for the Greeks".

The Greek historian Apollodorus and the Roman historian Justin, affirmed that the Bactrian Greeks conquered India. Justin, also described Demetrius I  as "King of the Indians". Greek and Indian sources indicate that the Greeks campaigned as far as Pataliputra until they were forced to retreat following a coup in Bactria in 170 BC.

The Heliodorus pillar is a stone column that was erected around 110 BCE in present-day central India in Vidisha, by Heliodorus, a Greek ambassador of the Indo-Greek king Antialcidas to the court of the Shunga king Bhagabhadra. The site is located about 5 miles from the Buddhist stupa of Sanchi.

The Roman Emperor Augustus received envoys from the Saka King. They gave him a letter which was written in Greek and asked for some diplomatic requests.

The King Phraotes received a Greek education at the court of his father and spoke Greek fluently.

Stephanus of Byzantium called the city Daedala in India as Indo-Cretan city, most probably because it was a settlement of Cretan mercenaries.

Tamil poems described the Greek soldiers who served as mercenaries for Indian kings as: "The valiant-eyed Yavanas, whose bodies were strong and of terrible aspect".

Alfred Charles Auguste Foucher said that some of the troops of Mara in the Gandhara sculptures may represent Greek mercenaries.

The Cilappatikaram mention Yavana soldiers who according to scholars, including professor Dikshitar, is reference to the Greek mercenaries who employed by the Tamil kings.

Patanjali, the commentator of Pāṇini describes two sieges that the Greeks made. The siege of Saketa and the siege of Madhyamika.

From a kharoshthi found in the Swat area of Gandhara, which dated to the 1st century BC, we know about the Greek meridarch Theodorus.

Trade

During the Roman and Byzantine period there were trade relations. (Indo-Roman trade relations)

The Isidore of Charax in his work The Parthian Stations described the trade route between the Levant and India in the 1st century BC.

The so-called Muziris papyrus which is written in Greek, contains crucial information regarding the cargo of a ship named the Hermapollon that sailed back to Egypt from the Muziris in India. Muziris is also mentioned in the Periplus of the Erythraean Sea as one of the Indian ports that Greek ships were sailing.

Some of the Indian ports that Greek merchants were visiting where Muziris, Barygaza, Barbarikon, Minnagara, Ujjain and Ariaca.

The Periplus of the Erythraean Sea was a manual written in Greek for navigators who carried trade between Roman Empire and other regions, including ancient India. It  gives detailed information about the ports, routes and commodities.

Ancient Greek and Roman writers also describe the ports of the Arabia Felix, which were used for the Indian trade.

Procopius writes that, when Byzantines didn't want to purchase, any longer, their silk from the Persians, due to their conflicts, some monks coming from India, who had also spent a long time in a country called Serinda and was beyond India, talked with the Emperor Justinian and promised to settle the silk question and the Byzantines would not need to buy again the silk from the Persians.

Chanakya mentioned Greeks and their polities in his Arthashastra.

Athenaeus in the Deipnosophistae wrote that Euthydemus the Athenian in his book on Vegetables calls a species of gourd as the Indian gourd (σικύαν Ἰνδικὴν) because the seed of that gourd was originally introduced from India.

After Alexander's period, there were trade relations between the Greek world and Sri Lanka. Ancient writers, describe in details what has been traded. Cosmas Indicopleustes wrote about a specific Greek merchant named ‘Sopatrus’ who had a trade relationship with Sri Lanka.
At the Jaffna Peninsula, archaeologists discovered gold coins with Greek inscriptions, most probably belonging to the Byzantine period.

Travelers and explorers
The Greek explorer Scylax, in about 515 BC, was sent by King Darius I of Persia to follow the course of the Indus River and discover where it led.

Nearchus, described  India and the people living there.

Onecicritus of Astypaleia who was a captain of Great Alexander’s navy wrote about Sri Lanka.

The Greek ethnographer and explorer of the Hellenistic period, Megasthenes was the ambassador of Seleucus I at India. In his work, Indika, he wrote the history of Indians and their culture. Megasthenes also mentioned the prehistoric arrival of God Dionysus and Herakles (Megasthenes' Herakles) in India.

Deimachus, who was an ambassador to the court of the Bindusara, also wrote about India.

Patrocles, was an admiral of Seleucus who sailed upon the Indian Ocean, and left an account.

Zarmanochegas, met Nicholas of Damascus in Antioch and later he also traveled to Athens where he burnt himself to death. Plutarch wrote that at Athens his "Indian tomb" was still there to his days.

Eudoxus of Cyzicus and Hippalus traveled to Indian with their ships.

Claudius Ptolemy, in his work mention a Greek captain, named Diogenes, who was returning from his trip to India, when the winds blown him off course and he had to stop below the Horn of Africa and since the winds were not favorable to travel North he traveled South and explored the East coast of Africa where he found the city of Rhapta. According to Ptolemy, this happened during the second trip of Diogenes to India. 

The Suda, a 10th Century Byzantine encyclopedia mentioned that when Theophilos the Indian returned from India he spent time in Antioch and the Emperor Constantius II treated him with all honor and respect.

Sozomen, wrote that Meropius (Μερόπιός), a philosopher of Tyre, traveled together with two of his relatives, Frumentius (Φρουμέντιός) and Edesius (Ἐδέσιος) to India.

The Christian Topography by Cosmas Indicopleustes was an essay in scientific geography written in Greek with illustrations and maps. The work mentioned India and the writer Cosmas Indicopleustes had actually made the journey and he described and sketched some of what he saw in his Topography. Indicopleustes means "Cosmas who sailed to India".

Cities and places

Around 510 BC Persians under the rule of Darius the Great moved the inhabitants of the Greek colony of Barca in Libya into Bactria. Later, Xerxes I also settled there the "Branchidae" who were the descendants of Greek priests who had once lived at Didyma. Herodotus also records Persian generals threatening to enslave daughters of the revolting Ionians and send them to Bactria if they didn't stop fighting.

According to legend the god Dionysus founded the city of Nysa and named it Nysa and the land Nysaea (Νυσαία) after his nurse and he named the mountain near the city, Meron (Μηρὸν) (i.e. thigh), because he grew in the thigh of Zeus. When Alexander arrived at the city, together with his Companion cavalry went to the mountain and they made ivy garlands and crowned themselves with them, as they were, singing hymns in honor of Dionysus. Alexander also offered sacrifices to Dionysus, and feasted in company with his companions.

Alexander the Great founded the cities of Nicaea and Alexandria Bucephalous. He also founded a city and named it after his dog Peritas. In addition he ordered the Philip (son of Machatas) to built the Alexandria on the Indus. He also founded other cities in India (for more info see List of cities founded by Alexander the Great).

Quintus Curtius Rufus wrote that Alexander founded a number of cities in the Indus Delta, but most probably he meant some garrisons.

Pliny the Elder wrote that Nearchus founded the town of Arbis during his voyage to India.

At the Anuradhapura Kingdom in Sri Lanka, there was a Greek settlement. Professor Merlin Peris, former Professor of Classics at the University of Peradeniya, wrote that “The Greeks whom King Pandukabhaya settled in the West Gate of Anuradhapura were not second or third generation of Greeks who arrived in northwest India but were men who, just two decades ago at the most, left Greek homelands as Alexander’s camp followers and come to Sri Lanka with or in the wake of Alexander’s troops. When their fellow Greeks showed reluctance to push further south, these Greeks apparently had done so.” Greeks called Sri Lanka as Taprobana, some Greek authors also used Palaisimoundou, Salike and Sieladiba.
Stephanus of Byzantium writes that a metropolis of the Taprobana was called Argyra. and that also there was a river which was called Phasis. 
Ptolemy called one of a group of islands which surrounded Sri Lanka as Nagadiba (see Jaffna Peninsula). 

According to Ptolemy, many Greek cities were founded by the Greco-Bactrians in northern India.
The cities of Sirkap and Demetriapolis were founded by Demetrius I of Bactria.

Eucratideia was founded by Eucratides I.

Panchaia was an island paradise located in the Indian Ocean mentioned by Greek writers.

Claudius Aelianus wrote that there were Macedonians who settled in India in the cities founded by Alexander.

Contacossyla (Κοντακόσσυλα) was an emporium in Maesolia (modern Masulipatam), mentioned by Ptolemy.

Stephanus of Byzantium wrote about a city called Daedala or Daidala in India, which he called it Indo-Cretan city, most probably because it was a settlement of Cretan mercenaries.

In addition, to the aforementioned cities, Stephanus of Byzantium also described many other Indian cities and places.

Greeks called the Punjab region as Pentapotamía, meaning five rivers.

Ptolemy calls the Rarassa (Ῥαράσσα or Ἠράρασα) the metropolis of the Caspeiraei in India intra Gangem.

Indian tribes
Greek writers mention many Indian tribes. For example the:
 Kirradae (Κιρρᾶδαι).
 Abastanes or Abastani or Sambastai or Sabarcae, probably the Ambashtha.
 Zamirae or Zamirai (Ζαμῖραι) and Gamerae or Gamerai (Γαμῆραι) was a tribe in India extra Gangem roughly in modern Myanmar.
 Xathri (Ξάθροι), a tribe Indians dwelling along the banks of the Hydraotes. They may have derived their name from the caste of the Kshatriyas.

Other
Pāṇini, an ancient Sanskrit grammarian, was acquainted with the word yavana (Greek) in his composition.

Kātyāyana was a Sanskrit grammarian, mathematician and Vedic priest who lived in ancient India. He explained the term yavanānī as the script of the Yavanas. He took the same line as Pāṇini that the Old Persian term yauna became Sanskritised to name all Greeks.

Theodectes, thought that the dark color of some Indians were because of the sun.

Athenaeus in his Deipnosophistae mention about a Basilis (Βάσιλις) who wrote a series of books about the History of India.

Claudius Aelianus wrote about the animals in India. He also mentioned that there were Macedonians who settled in India in the cities founded by Alexander.

The ancient Greek medical system enriched with local elements encountered a large response to the Indian people and to the physicians.

India and Indians are mentioned in some of the Martial's Epigrams.

A lot of entries in the Suda, the Byzantine encyclopedia, are about India.

Modern archaeological evidence from Bronze Age

Bronze Age paintings in a building at Akrotiri (Akrotiri was a Minoan settlement on the island of Santorini), depicted monkeys. Most of the monkeys have been identified as Egyptian species. But there was a species that was harder to identify. Archaeologists teamed up with primatologists in order to re-examine the monkey paintings. The team has identified the monkey as a grey langur. Grey langurs live in southern Asia in what is now Nepal, Bhutan and India, particularly in the Indus Valley. Researcher say that Mesopotamia may have functioned as an intermediary that enabled the movement of goods, raw materials, people, and iconography between the east and west. Mesopotamia may have even afforded an opportunity for Aegean peoples to encounter the creatures themselves, first-hand.

See also

Indo-Greek Kingdom
Greco-Bactrian Kingdom
Indo-Scythians
Greek campaigns in India
Achaemenid conquest of the Indus Valley

Greco-Buddhism 
Greco-Buddhism
Greco-Buddhist monasticism
Greco-Buddhist art
Gandharan Buddhism
Buddhism and the Roman world
Indo-Greek religions
Buddhas of Bamiyan
Third Buddhist council

Trade and relations 
 Buddhism and the Roman world
 Economic history of India
 Historic GDP of India (1-1947 CE)
 Indus–Mesopotamia relations
 Indo-Roman relations
 Indian Ocean trade
 Sino-Roman relations
 Indian maritime history
 Meluhha trade with Sumer

References

Bibliography
 
 
 Dictionary of Greek and Roman Geography (1854), William Smith, LLD, Ed., India
 Dictionary of Greek and Roman Geography (1854), William Smith, LLD, Ed., Taprobane

 
Ancient international relations
India
Bilateral relations of India
 
Bilateral relations of Pakistan
Indian Ocean trade
Indo-Greek religions and philosophy
Foreign relations of ancient India
Buddhism in the ancient Mediterranean